Satanic Panic in the Attic is the sixth album released by the band Of Montreal. The album, like later albums The Sunlandic Twins and Hissing Fauna, Are You The Destroyer?, was made almost entirely by Kevin Barnes.

The cover artwork is done by the singer/songwriter's brother, David Barnes, with insert art by then-wife Nina Barnes. The cover art is a psychedelic parody of El Greco's The Burial of the Count of Orgaz.

A 10th anniversary edition of the album was released exclusively on vinyl for Record Store Day 2014. The release contains the original album on 180g yellow vinyl as well as a 180g light blue vinyl disc with bonus tracks recorded around the same time as the album.

Critical reception

In August 2009, the webzine Pitchfork named "Disconnect the Dots" the 260th track in their staff list "The Top 500 Tracks of the 2000s".

Track listing

References 

2004 albums
Of Montreal albums
Polyvinyl Record Co. albums